Robert Wilkie (23 November 1878 – 7 November 1966) was a New Zealand cricketer. He played one first-class match for Otago in 1899/1900.

See also
 List of Otago representative cricketers

References

External links
 

1878 births
1966 deaths
New Zealand cricketers
Otago cricketers
Sportspeople from East Ayrshire
Scottish cricketers
Scottish emigrants to New Zealand
New Zealand emigrants to Australia